Redoubt Mountain (alternatively Mount Redoubt) is a mountain located in Banff National Park, in the Canadian Rockies of Alberta, Canada. It forms the southern buttress of Boulder Pass.

The mountain was named in 1908 by Arthur O. Wheeler, founding member of the Alpine Club of Canada (AAC), as it resembled a redoubt (an outer military defense).

The mountain can be climbed on a moderate to difficult scrambling route on the northwestern ridge.

Like other mountains in Banff Park, it is composed of sedimentary rock laid down from the Precambrian to Jurassic periods. Formed in shallow seas, this sedimentary rock was pushed east and over the top of younger rock during the Laramide orogeny.

Based on the Köppen climate classification, the mountain is located in a subarctic climate with cold, snowy winters, and mild summers.

See also

List of mountains of Canada
Geology of Alberta

Gallery

References

Two-thousanders of Alberta
Mountains of Banff National Park
Canadian Rockies